Sandhill, Belize is a populated settlement located in the nation of Belize. It is a mainland village located in the Belize District.

References

Populated places in Belize District
Belize Rural North